The 2023 season is the 78th season in the existence of Kelantan Football Club. It will be the club's first campaign back in the Malaysia Super League since 2018 following their promotion from the previous season. In addition to the league, they will also compete in the Malaysia FA Cup and the Malaysia Cup.

On 13 January 2023, Choi Moon-sik has been appointed as club's new head coach.

Management team

Players

First-team squad

Out on loan

Transfers

First leg 

In:

Out:

Competitions

Pre-season and friendlies

Malaysia Super League

League table

Results summary

Results by round

Matches

Malaysia FA Cup

Squad statistics

Appearances and goals
Players listed with no appearances have been in the matchday squad but only as unused substitutes.

|-
! colspan=14 style=background:#dcdcdc; text-align:center| Goalkeepers

|-
! colspan=14 style=background:#dcdcdc; text-align:center| Defenders

|-
! colspan=14 style=background:#dcdcdc; text-align:center| Midfielders

|-
! colspan=14 style=background:#dcdcdc; text-align:center| Forwards

|-
! colspan=14 style=background:#dcdcdc; text-align:center|Out on Loan

|-
! colspan=14 style=background:#dcdcdc; text-align:center|Left the Club during the Season
|-

Under-23s

Current squad

The Under-23s squad consists of players who participate in MFL Cup.

MFL Cup

Appearances and goals

References

2023
Kelantan
Kelantan F.C.